George Keith Lucas (18 August 1920 – 13 November 1969) was an Australian rules footballer who played with South Melbourne in the Victorian Football League (VFL).

Notes

External links 

George Lucas's playing statistics from The VFA Project

1920 births
1969 deaths
Australian rules footballers from Melbourne
Sydney Swans players
Brighton Football Club players
People from Clifton Hill, Victoria